In computer hardware, a white box is a personal computer or server without a well-known brand name.

The term is usually applied to systems assembled by small system integrators and to homebuilt computer systems assembled by end users from parts purchased separately at retail. In this sense, building a white box system is part of the DIY movement.

The term is also applied to high volume production of unbranded PCs that began in the mid-1980s with 8 MHz Turbo XT systems selling for just under $1000.

In 2002, around 30% of personal computers sold annually were white box systems.

Operating systems 

While PCs built by system manufacturers generally come with a pre-installed operating system, white boxes from both large and small system vendors and other VAR channels can be ordered with or without a pre-installed OS. Usually when ordered with an operating system, the system builder uses an OEM copy of the OS.

Whitebook or Intel "Common Building Blocks" 
Intel defined form factor and interconnection standards for notebook computer components, including "Barebones" (chassis and motherboard), hard disk drive, optical disk drive, LCD, battery pack, keyboard, and AC/DC adapter. These building blocks are primarily marketed to computer building companies, rather than DIY users.

Costs 

While saving money is a common motivation for building one's own PC, today it is generally more expensive to build a low-end PC than to buy a pre-built one from a well-known manufacturer, due to the build quality and the total cost of the parts being used. For these reasons, it is usually better to just buy a pre-assembled computer from a well-known manufacturer or brand name rather than just have people build it themselves (unless one has the talent, skills, budget, and the knowledge to do so).

See also 
Beige box
DIY ethic
Enthusiast computing
Homebuilt computer
White-label product

References 

Computer enclosure
Electronics manufacturing
Personal computers
Computer jargon